"Empire" is a song recorded by Colombian singer and songwriter Shakira for her self-titled tenth studio album, Shakira (2014). It was written by Steve Mac and Ina Wroldsen, while production was handled by Mac and Shakira. The song was released as the second single from the album on 22 February 2014. "Empire" is a downtempo rock and Dubstep ballad about finding a love so powerful their empire could make "the world unite". Her vocals on the track was compared to those of Tori Amos, Jewel, Joni Mitchell and Alanis Morissette.

Upon its release, "Empire" was acclaimed by music critics, who commended the singer for getting back to her rock roots. The song charted moderately in countries like France, South Korea and Spain. In the United States, it peaked at number 58 on the Billboard Hot 100 chart. The song's accompanying video was released on 25 March 2014 and portrays Shakira playing a runaway bride unharmed by fire and on the side of the Montserrat mountain, near Barcelona. Shakira performed the song in a number of places, including The Voice (both U.S. and UK), Billboard Music Awards, The Tonight Show Starring Jimmy Fallon, iHeartRadio Music Awards and others.

Background and release 
After the success of her ninth studio album, Sale el Sol, in 2010, Shakira revealed in November 2011, "I've begun to explore in the recording studio whenever I have time in Barcelona and here in Miami. I'm working with different producers and DJs, and I try to feed off from that and find new sources of inspiration and new musical motivation. I'm anxious to return to the studio. My body is asking for it." In 2012, it was reported that Shakira was shooting the video for the tentative-first single "Truth or Dare" in Lisbon, Portugal. However, due to Shakira's pregnancy, the song was not released. Later, in March 2014, Shakira explained to Billboard that, "It's been two-and-a-half years of making songs, trashing them, doing them again, doing eight versions of each song, having a baby, doing The Voice, coming back to the studio, reconnecting with my songs".

In December 2013, Sony Music Entertainment reported that Shakira's new single would be released in January 2014, and that it was supposed to be a duet with Barbadian recording artist Rihanna. On 13 January 2014, "Can't Remember to Forget You" was released and indeed features Rihanna. On 24 February 2014, Popjustice announced that "Empire" would be the album's second single. The cover art features Shakira in a white strapless dress and hair pulled back. Shakira also premiered the track on Vevo on the same day, and it was offered as a free download with a pre-order of Shakira. Shakira's official Facebook page announced it as the second single from the album.

Composition 
"Empire" was written by British songwriter Steve Mac and Norwegian Ina Wroldsen, while Mac produced the song. "Empire" is a rock and Dubstep ballad, beginning in acoustic mode with a sparse intro before Shakira unleashes her "inner head-banger" and "howls her way" through the chorus, according to Idolator'''s Mike Wass. Lyrically, "Empire" talks about a bursting passion that the singer simply cannot express in words.Billboards Leila Cobo points out that "Empire" sounds a little like a Tori Amos song, writing that, "the fragility in Shakira's voice, the background strings and captivating hook are all eerily reminiscent of Amos's Little Earthquakes." Maggie Pannacione of Artistdirect compared the song to the works of Joni Mitchell and Alanis Morissette, but "in the Shakira Latina way."

The song is written in the key of both C minor and C major at a tempo of 80 beats per minute, following a chord progression of C-Fm/Ab-Bb

 Critical reception 
"Empire" was critically acclaimed, with most critics praising the singer for getting back to her rock roots. Leila Cobo of Billboard called the track "a gorgeous rock ballad that harks back to Shakira's earliest work." Jason Lipshut also of Billboard called it a "downtempo, downright emo track".  Jazz Tangcay of So So Gay named it a "thumping ballad" that "takes a few listens but it seems rock guitar and a thumping sound is the direction Shakira is going with her forthcoming self-titled album." Mike Wass of Idolator wrote that 'Empire' "is her rowdiest rock adventure by far".

Emily Mackay of Digital Spy described the track as "a more mature, classic, piano-led sort of pop with a star-gazing, philosophical rush", with "a cosmic-orgasmic chorus". Maggie Pannacione of ArtistDirect simply called it "flawless and unique", while Jamieson Cox of Time magazine complimented the track for having "Bond-theme grandeur and a spotlight on Shakira's rich, soaring vocals", noting that, "If you're going to give your single an imperial moniker, it'd better come with tons of space and an explosive climax; Shakira delivers on both counts."

 Music video 
On 10 March, Shakira posted to her social media pictures of herself shooting the video for "Empire". The pictures find the singer wearing a white wedding dress. On 13 March 2014, a lyric video was uploaded to her YouTube account. Mike Wass of Idolator called it "a beautifully shot nature documentary with a rather incredible soundtrack." He went on to describe the lyric video, stating that, "The visual feast features slow motion photography of seeds sprouting and flowers blooming — an exceedingly good fit for the Colombian's kooky lyrics about stars making love to the universe."

The official music video was released on 25 March 2014, directed by Darren Craig, Jonathan Craven and Jeff Nicholas from the Uprising Creative. In the video, Shakira emerges as a beautiful bride in white about to walk down the aisle in a flower-decked church. But in a dreamy twist, Shakira has a change of heart and is seen picking up her skirts and running away across a green sunlit field. Later, she's seen standing on the church steps with her ruffled train catching fire.

The Empire music video filmed in the city of Esparreguera (Spain), near an abandoned suburb.

 Live performances 
On 25 March 2014, Shakira held an iHeartRadio album release party which was presented by Target, live from the iHeartRadio Theater Los Angeles. During the release party, Shakira performed four songs from the album, which included "Empire". The following day, Shakira performed the song, during a promotional interview with Jimmy Fallon on The Tonight Show Starring Jimmy Fallon.
The same day, Shakira performed "Hips Don't Lie" and "Empire" during a live set on The Today Show at the Rockerfella stadium. On 29 March 2014, Shakira performed "Empire" live on The Voice UK. On 22 April 2014, she performed the song on The Voice'', on which she is a judge. On 1 May 2014, she performed the song at the first annual iHeartRadio Music Awards. On 10 May 2014, she performed the song at the Wango Tango. On 18 May 2014, she performed at the Billboard Music Awards.

The song was performed by Shakira during the Super Bowl LIV halftime show.

Charts

Weekly charts

Year-end charts

Certifications

Release history

References

2010s ballads
2014 singles
Monitor Latino Top General number-one singles
Shakira songs
Songs written by Steve Mac
Spanglish songs
Rock ballads
Song recordings produced by Steve Mac
Songs written by Ina Wroldsen
2014 songs
RCA Records singles
rock songs